Berlin Township may refer to:

Berlin Township, Bureau County, Illinois
Berlin Township, Ionia County, Michigan
Berlin Charter Township, Michigan, in Monroe County
Berlin Township, St. Clair County, Michigan
Berlin Township, Minnesota
Berlin Township, New Jersey
Berlin Township, Cass County, North Dakota, in Cass County, North Dakota
Berlin Township, Sheridan County, North Dakota, in Sheridan County, North Dakota
Berlin Township, Wells County, North Dakota, in Wells County, North Dakota
Berlin Township, Delaware County, Ohio
Berlin Township, Erie County, Ohio
Berlin Township, Holmes County, Ohio
Berlin Township, Knox County, Ohio
Berlin Township, Mahoning County, Ohio
Berlin Township, Pennsylvania

See also
 Berlin (disambiguation)

Township name disambiguation pages